There are 18 Biosphere Reserves in India.
to protect larger areas of natural habitat than a typical national park or animal sanctuary, and that often include one or more national parks or reserves, along with buffer zones that are open to some economic uses. Protection is granted not only to the flora and fauna of the protected region, but also to the human communities who inhabit these regions, and their ways of life. In total there are 18 biosphere reserves in India

World network
Twelve of the eighteen biosphere reserves are a part of the World Network of Biosphere Reserves, based on the UNESCO Man and the Biosphere (MAB) Programme list.

List of biosphere reserves in India

Key faunas

Potential sites 
The following is a list of potential sites for Biosphere Reserves as selected by Ministry of Forests and Environment:

 Abujmarh, Chhattisgarh
 Andaman and Nicobar, North Islands 
 Chintapalli, Visakhapatnam Andhra Pradesh
 Kanha, Madhya Pradesh
 Kovalam, Kerala
 Lakshadweep Islands, Lakshadweep
 Little Rann of Kutch, Gujarat
 Phawngpui (Blue Mountain), Mizoram
 Namdapha, Arunachal Pradesh
 Singhbhum, Jharkhand 
 Tawang and West Kameng, Arunachal Pradesh
 Thar Desert, Rajasthan
 Tadoba National Park and Sanjay Gandhi National Park, Maharashtra

See also

 Bodhi Tree
 List of Banyan trees in India
 List of national parks of India
 Sacred groves of India
 Sacred trees
 Wildlife sanctuaries of India

References

External links

Ministry of Environment and Forests

 
 
Nature conservation in India
Protected areas of India